Philippe Gomès (born 27 October 1958) is a New Caledonian politician and, from 5 June 2009 to 11 March 2011, President of the Government of New Caledonia, an overseas territory of France in the Pacific Ocean. He served as a member of the National Assembly from 2008 until 2022.

Biography 
Gomès was born in Algiers, Algeria. He was appointed by the Congress of New Caledonia after the provincial election held on 10 May 2009. He is backed by a wide coalition of the four main loyalists (i.e. anti-independence) parties that control 36 of the 54 seats in the Congress, now political allies after having fought each other during the campaign : The Rally–UMP, Caledonia Together (Gomès' party), Future Together and Movement for Diversity. In the Government, 7 of the 11 members come from those pro-France parties.

A former member of RPCR (older name of The Rally–UMP and historical anti-independence party in New Caledonia), Gomès left it in 2004 to found with others dissidents (like Marie-Noëlle Thémereau or Harold Martin) the Future Together (Avenir ensemble) party that defeated RPCR in the provincial election on 9 May 2004. Then, Philippe Gomès became president of the South Province, by far the most economically developed and most urbanized part of New Caledonia. After a conflict between him and some members of the party, including Harold Martin or Didier Leroux, he entered again in dissent, leaving Future Together to create his own movement called Caledonia Together (Calédonie ensemble).

He was also mayor of La Foa, a rural commune on the West Coast of Grande Terre (the main island of the archipelago), from 1989 to 2008. In this village, he notably created an annual film festival, the first and the only one in New Caledonia. Its first president was the French film director Jean-Pierre Jeunet, and among his successors have included Claude Pinoteau, Jane Campion, Claude Brasseur or Patrice Leconte.

Since March 2011, he served in the New Caledonia Government, as minister for Transfers of civil security, civil and commercial rules, and of civil status.

On 17 June 2012, he was elected as member of the National Assembly of France in the 2nd constituency of New Caledonia. He joined the Union of Democrats and Independents group in the National Assembly, chaired by former minister Jean-Louis Borloo.

In the 2022 legislative election, Gomes lost his seat in the National Assembly for New Caledonia's 2nd constituency to Nicolas Metzdorf.

References

1958 births
Living people
People from Algiers
Presidents of the Government of New Caledonia
People from South Province, New Caledonia
Members of the Congress of New Caledonia
The Rally (New Caledonia) politicians
Mayors of places in New Caledonia
French people of Algerian descent
French people of Portuguese descent
New Caledonian people of Algerian descent
Deputies of the 14th National Assembly of the French Fifth Republic
Deputies of the 15th National Assembly of the French Fifth Republic
Union of Democrats and Independents politicians
Members of Parliament for New Caledonia